Keachi (pronounced "key-chai"; also spelled Keatchie or Keachie) is a town in DeSoto Parish, Louisiana, United States. The population was 295 at the 2010 census. It is part of the Shreveport–Bossier City Metropolitan Statistical Area.

History
Keachi features several sites on the National Register of Historic Places, including Allen House, Keachi Baptist Church, Keachi Presbyterian Church, Keachi Store, Keachi United Methodist Church, Liberty Lodge, The Oaks, Prude House, Spell House, and the Swearingen House. It also includes Keachie College.

During the American Civil War, the Keatchie "highlanders" obtained $1,500 from the DeSoto Parish Police Jury for the war effort. The highlanders were known for their unusual dress, kilts and plaids, purchased with these funds.

Geography
Keachi is located in northwestern DeSoto Parish at  (32.182055, -93.906658). Louisiana Highway 5 passes through the town, leading east  to Kickapoo and south  to Longstreet. Highway 172 leads west  to the Texas border, and Highway 789 leads north  to Spring Ridge.

Demographics

As of the census of 2000, there were 323 people, 135 households, and 91 families residing in the town. The racial makeup of the town was 65.33% White, 29.41% African American, 2.17% from other races, and 3.10% from two or more races. Hispanic or Latino of any race were 2.79% of the population.

There were 135 households, out of which 31.1% had children under the age of 18 living with them, 56.3% were married couples living together, 8.1% had a female householder with no husband present, and 31.9% were non-families. 29.6% of all households were made up of individuals, and 14.8% had someone living alone who was 65 years of age or older. The average household size was 2.39 and the average family size was 2.96.

In the town, the population was spread out, with 22.3% under the age of 18, 10.5% from 18 to 24, 23.5% from 25 to 44, 26.3% from 45 to 64, and 17.3% who were 65 years of age or older. The median age was 40 years. For every 100 females, there were 90.0 males. For every 100 females age 18 and over, there were 93.1 males.

The median income for a household in the town was $31,071, and the median income for a family was $41,667. Males had a median income of $25,625 versus $20,625 for females. The per capita income for the town was $16,225. About 17.9% of families and 23.4% of the population were below the poverty line, including 38.6% of those under age 18 and 26.2% of those age 65 or over.

References

National Register of Historic Places

Towns in DeSoto Parish, Louisiana
Towns in Louisiana
Towns in Shreveport – Bossier City metropolitan area